The Vulture crown was an ancient Egyptian crown worn by Great Royal Wives and female pharaohs. The Vulture crown was a crown that depicted a vulture, with its two wings hanging from both sides of the head. It was a symbol of protection from the vulture goddess Nekhbet, who often wore this crown when depicted in an anthropomorphic form. These crowns were frequently worn by the Great Royal Wife, high ranking priestesses and female pharaohs. These crowns were also sometimes equipped with the Uraeus, representing both Upper (Nekhbet) and Lower Egypt (the Uraeus).

Gallery

References
Classroom: The Significance of Vultures on Egyptian Headdresses

Egyptian artefact types
Crowns (headgear)